Daphnella delicata, common name the delicate pleurotoma, is a species of sea snail, a marine gastropod mollusk in the family Raphitomidae.

Description
(Original description) The subulate, elongated shell is thin and hyaline. It is transversely minutely and very closely elevately striated. The aperture is short. The color of the shell is transparent white, very palely spotted with orange.

Distribution
This marine species occurs off the Tuamotu, Tahiti and Samoa

References

 Taylor, J.D. (1973). Provisional list of the mollusca of Aldabra Atoll. 
 Kilburn, R.N. (1977) Taxonomic studies on the marine Mollusca of southern Africa and Mozambique. Part 1. Annals of the Natal Museum, 23, 173–214
 Liu J.Y. [Ruiyu] (ed.). (2008). Checklist of marine biota of China seas. China Science Press. 1267 pp

External links
 

delicata